Evangelista Cittadini was a Roman Catholic prelate who served as Bishop of Alessano (1542–1549).

Biography
On 26 April 1542, Evangelista Cittadini was appointed during the papacy of Pope Paul III as Bishop of Alessano. On 28 December 1544, he was consecrated bishop by Taddeo Pepoli, Bishop of Carinola, with Antonio Numai, Bishop of Isernia, and Ludovico Simonetta, Bishop of Pesaro, serving as co-consecrators. He served as Bishop of Alessano until his resignation in 1549.

References

External links and additional sources
 (for Chronology of Bishops) 
 (for Chronology of Bishops) 

16th-century Italian Roman Catholic bishops
Bishops appointed by Pope Paul III